Mount Maslen is a mountain,  high, standing  west of Mount Currie in the Raggatt Mountains of Enderby Land, Antarctica. It was plotted from air photos taken from Australian National Antarctic Research Expeditions aircraft in 1956 and was named by the Antarctic Names Committee of Australia for A.W.G. Maslen, the officer-in-charge at Mawson Station in 1961.

References

Mountains of Enderby Land